The 2004 Beach Handball World Championships are a nine-team tournament in both men's and women's beach handball, held at El Gouna in Egypt in 2004. This were the first ever beach handball world championships held in history of the sport.  Matches are played in sets, the team that wins two sets is the winner of a match. When teams are equal in points the head-to-head result is decisive.

Final rankings

Men

Women

References

Beach Handball World Championships
B
H
H